Petrus Torkilsson (lat. Petrus Tyrgilli) was Bishop of Linköping, 1342–1351 and Archbishop of Uppsala, Sweden, 1351–1366.

It is unknown when he was born, but the first mentioning of him is from 1320, when he was vicar in Färentuna. He was chancellor of the King Magnus Eriksson in 1340 and continued to support him during the civil wars in the 1360s.

References 
 Nordisk Familjelexikon, article Petrus In Swedish

1366 deaths
14th-century Roman Catholic archbishops in Sweden
Roman Catholic archbishops of Uppsala
Bishops of Linköping
Year of birth unknown